Mendbayaryn Jantsankhorloo (born 15 March 1944) is a Mongolian former sports shooter. He competed at the 1968, 1972, 1976 and the 1980 Summer Olympics.

References

External links
 

1944 births
Living people
Mongolian male sport shooters
Olympic shooters of Mongolia
Shooters at the 1968 Summer Olympics
Shooters at the 1972 Summer Olympics
Shooters at the 1976 Summer Olympics
Shooters at the 1980 Summer Olympics
Mendbayaryn Jantsankhorloo
Asian Games medalists in shooting
Shooters at the 1974 Asian Games
Shooters at the 1982 Asian Games
Asian Games gold medalists for Mongolia
Medalists at the 1982 Asian Games
20th-century Mongolian people